Unidentified decedent or unidentified person (also abbreviated as UID or UP) is a term in American English used to describe a corpse of a person whose identity cannot be established by police and medical examiners. In many cases, it is several years before the identities of some UIDs are found, while in some cases, they are never identified. A UID may remain unidentified due to lack of evidence as well as absence of personal identification such as a driver's license. Where the remains have deteriorated or been mutilated to the point that the body is not easily recognized, a UID's face may be reconstructed to show what they had looked like before death. UIDs are often referred to by the placeholder names "John Doe" or "Jane Doe".

Causes 
There were approximately 40,000 UIDs in the United States as of 2006, and numerous others elsewhere. A body may go unidentified due to death in a state where the person was unrecorded, an advanced state of decomposition or major facial injuries. In many cases in the United States, teenagers with a history of running away would be removed from missing person files when they would turn 18, thus eliminating potential matches with existing unidentified person listings.

Location 
Some UIDs die outside their native state. The Sumter County Does, murdered in South Carolina, were thought to have been Canadian. Both were eventually identified as individuals from Pennsylvania and Minnesota. Barbara Hess Precht died in Ohio in 2006 but was not identified until 2014. She had been living as a transient with her husband in California for decades but returned to her native state of Ohio, where she died of unknown circumstances. In both of these cases, the UIDs were found in a recognizable state and had their fingerprints and dental records taken with ease. It is unknown if the Sumter County Does' DNA was later recovered, since their bodies would require exhumation to recover DNA. In Lourdes, France, a corpse believed to have been native to a different country was discovered. Many undocumented immigrants who die in the United States after crossing the border from Mexico remain unidentified.

Decomposition 
Many UIDs are found long after they die and are found to have decomposed severely. This significantly changes their facial features and may prevent identification through fingerprints. Environmental conditions often are a major factor in decomposition, as some UIDs are found months after death with little decomposition if their bodies are placed in cold areas. Some are found in warm areas shortly after death, but hot temperatures and scavenging animals deteriorated the features. In some cases, warm temperatures mummify the corpse, which also distorts its features, though the tissues have survived initial decomposition. One example is the "Persian Princess", who died in the 1990s but, in an act of archaeological forgery, was untruthfully stated in Pakistan to have been over 2,000 years old. A man found in Idar-Oberstein, Germany, in 1994 had died months before his body was found, yet in some places, his skin had not deteriorated and tattoos were found, which are also used to identify the dead.

Putrefaction 
Putrefaction often occurs when bacteria decompose the remains and generate gasses inside, causing the corpse to swell and become discolored. In cases such as the Rogers family, who were murdered in 1989 by Oba Chandler, the bodies were deposited in water but surfaced after gasses in their remains caused them to float to the surface. They were deceased a short period of time but were already severely decomposed and unrecognizable, due to putrefaction that occurred while underwater and high temperatures. It was not until a week later that dental records revealed their identities.

Skeletonization 
Skeletonization occurs when the UID has decayed to the point that bones and possibly some tissues are all that is found, usually when death occurred a significant amount of time before discovery. If a skeletonized body is found, fingerprints and toeprints are impossible to recover, unless they have survived the initial decomposition of the remains. Fingerprints are often used to identify the dead and were used widely before DNA comparison was possible. In some cases, partial remains limit the available information; for example, a woman's skull found in Frankfurt, Germany, was insufficient to estimate her height and weight.

Skeletonized UIDs are often forensically reconstructed if searching dental records and DNA databases is unsuccessful.

Burning 
Often, someone who tries to conceal a body attempts to destroy it or render it unrecognizable. The currently unidentified Yermo John Doe was killed approximately one hour before he was found, but was completely unrecognizable. When Lynn Breeden, a Canadian model, was murdered and set ablaze in a dumpster, her body was so severely damaged that DNA processing and fingerprint analysis were impossible. She was identified sometime later after her unique dentition matched her dental records, and DNA extracted from her blood at a different scene was matched. Linda Agostini's body was found burned near Albury, Australia in 1934. Her remains were identified ten years later through dental comparison.

Identification process 
Usually, bodies are identified by comparing their usually unique DNA, fingerprints and dental characteristics. DNA is considered the most accurate, but was not widely used until the 1990s. It is often obtained through hair follicles, blood, tissue and other biological material. Bodies can also be identified with other physical information, such as illnesses, evidence of surgery, breaks and fractures, and height and weight information. A medical examiner will often be involved with identifying a body.

Mortuary photographs 

Many police departments and medical examiners have made efforts to identify the deceased by placing mortuary photographs of the UID's face online. In some instances, the mortuary photographs would be retouched of wounds if they are to be released to the public. Dismembered corpses may also be digitally altered to appear attached to the body. This is not considered to be the most effective method, as the nature of death often distorts the UID's face. An example of this is that of "Grateful Doe," who was killed in a vehicular crash in 1995. He sustained extreme trauma that disfigured his face.

A Jane Doe found in a river in Milwaukee, Wisconsin, had died months earlier, but was preserved by the cold temperatures. Her morgue photographs were displayed publicly on a medical examiner's website, but her face had been distorted by swelling after absorbing water, with additional decomposition.

Death masks have also been used to assist with identification, which have been stated to be more accurate, as they are required to display "relaxed expressions," which often do not illustrate the faces of the UIDs as they were found, such as that of L'Inconnue de la Seine, a French suicide victim found in the late 1800s. However, a death mask will still depict sunken eyes or other characteristics of a long-term illness, which do not often show how they would have looked in life.

Reconstructions 

When a body is found in an advanced state of decomposition or has died violently, reconstructions are sometimes required to receive assistance from the public, when releasing images of a corpse is considered taboo. Often, those in a recognizable state will often be reconstructed due to the same reason.

Faces can be reconstructed with a three-dimensional model or by 2D, which includes sketches or digital reconstructions, similar to facial composites.

Sketches have been used in a variety of cases. Forensic artist Karen T. Taylor created her own method during the 1980s, which involved much more precise techniques, such as estimating locations and sizes of the features of a skull. This method has been shown to be fairly successful.

The National Center for Missing and Exploited Children has developed methods to estimate the likenesses of the faces of UIDs whose remains were too deteriorated to create a two-dimensional sketch or reconstruction due to the lack of tissue on the bones. A skull would be placed through a CT scanner and the image would then be manipulated with a software that was intended for architecture design, to add digital layers of tissue based on the UID's age, sex and race.

Examples 
The following gallery depicts various ways UIDs have been reconstructed. None of those shown have been identified.

Problems 
In some cases, such as that of Colleen Orsborn, the true identity of the unidentified person is excluded from the case. In Orsborn's case, she had fractured one of the bones in her leg, but a medical examiner who performed the autopsy on her remains was not able to discover evidence of the injury and subsequently excluded her from the case. It was not until 2011 when DNA confirmed Orsborn was the victim found in 1984. In cases such as the Racine County Jane Doe, a rule out has also been subjected to criticism. Aundria Bowman, a teen who disappeared in 1989 who bore a strong resemblance to a body found in 1999, was excluded, according to the National Missing and Unidentified Persons System. On an online forum, known as Websleuths, users have disagreed with this ruling. In the case of Lavender Doe, a mother of a missing girl also disagreed with the exclusion of her missing daughter through DNA, as she claimed the reconstruction of the victim looked very similar to her daughter.

Notable cases

Unidentified 

Whitehall Mystery, England, unidentified since 1888
Oak Grove Jane Doe, United States, unidentified since 1946
The Somerton Man, Australia, unidentified since 1948, possibly identified in 2022.
Miss X, United States, unidentified since 1967, possibly identified in 2023.
Isdal Woman, Norway, unidentified since 1970
Little Miss Lake Panasoffkee, United States, unidentified since 1971
Perry County Jane Doe, United States, unidentified since 1979
Sahara Sue, United States, unidentified since 1979
Vernon County Jane Doe, United States, unidentified since 1984
Spokane Millie Doe, United States, unidentified since 1984
"Julie Doe", United States, unidentified since 1988
The Gentleman of Heligoland, Germany, unidentified since 1994
Jennifer Fairgate, Norway, unidentified since 1995.
Mary Anderson, United States, unidentified since 1996
Persian Princess, Pakistan, unidentified since 1996
"Adam", United Kingdom, unidentified since 2001
Peter Bergmann, Ireland, unidentified since 2009

Formerly unidentified 
Linda Agostini, murdered in 1934 in Australia and identified in 1944. She was previously known as "Pyjama Girl."
Barbara Ann Hackmann Taylor, murdered in 1968 and identified in 1998; she was previously nicknamed "Tent Girl."
Amber Creek, Creek's frozen body was discovered on 6 February 1997, in Racine County, Wisconsin. She was known as "Racine County Jane Doe" and was identified in June 1998.
David Glenn Lewis, disappeared from his home near Amarillo, Texas, under unusual circumstances in 1993 and killed in an apparent accident on a state highway near Yakima, Washington, shortly afterwards; as he had no identification on him he was not identified until 2004.
Erica Green, formerly known as "Precious Doe," murdered in 2001 and identified in 2005.
George Robert Johnston, formerly known as the "Ballarat Bandit," a Canadian man who committed suicide in California in 2004 and identified in 2006.
Tammy Vincent, Vincent's burned body was discovered on the morning of 26 September 1979, in Tiburon, California, and identified in July 2007, Prior to identification, Vincent was known as "Tiburon Jane Doe".
Riley Ann Sawyers, nicknamed "Baby Grace," murdered in 2007 and identified later that year.
Atcel Olmedo, formerly known as "DuPage Johnny Doe", murdered in 2005 and identified in 2011.
Anjelica Castillo, formerly "Baby Hope," murdered in 1991 and identified in 2013.
Kori Lamaster, as known nicknamed "Pogonip Jane" and "Kori Bowman", found in Pogonip Park, California in 1994 and identified in 2013.
Barbara Precht, nicknamed "Pearl Lady", found in the Ohio River in 2006 and identified in 2014.
Michelle Garvey, found murdered on 1 July 1982, in Baytown, Texas, and known as "Baytown Jane Doe" until her identification in 2014.
Tammy Alexander, found murdered in 1979 and identified in 2015. She was formerly known as "Caledonia Jane Doe" and "Cali Doe."
Brenda Gerow, found on 8 April 1981, in Tucson, Arizona, and known as "Pima County Jane Doe" until she was identified in 2015.
Carol Ann Cole, found murdered on 28 February 1981, in Bossier Parish, Louisiana, and known as "Bossier Doe" until her identification in February 2015.
Jason Callahan, known prior to identification as "Grateful Doe," died in a 1995 car accident and identified in 2015.
Marcia King, previously known as "Buckskin Girl," found murdered in 1981 and identified in 2018.
Linda Pagano, previously known as "Strongsville Jane Doe", found murdered in 1975 and identified in 2018. Due to a clerical error, Pagano's case had not been added to national databases until her cemetery record was rediscovered in 2016 by an amateur genealogist.
Debra Jackson, found murdered in 1979 and identified in 2019. She was previously nicknamed "Orange Socks" for the only clothing remaining on her body upon discovery.
Joseph Henry Loveless, whose partial remains were located in 1979 and identified in 2019. Loveless' was estimated to have been murdered in 1916, marking the oldest identification using forensic genealogy thus far.
Danny Stutzman, previously known as "Little Boy Blue" and "Matthew", was discovered on December 24, 1985, and identified in 1987.

Identified in 2020s 
Elizabeth Roberts, a teenaged girl murdered in 1977 and identified in 2020. Nicknamed “Precious Jane Doe” by the detective who reopened her case, Roberts is an early case of DNA sequencing using rootless hair.
Alisha Heinrich, found murdered in 1982 and identified in 2020. She was previously known as "Delta Dawn."
Dean and Tina Clouse, found murdered on January 12, 1981, and publicly identified on the 40th anniversary of their discoveries. Their missing infant daughter was found alive in Oklahoma in 2022.
James Freund and Pamela Buckley, found murdered on 9 August 1976, and publicly identified on 21 January 2021; formerly known as the "Sumter County Does."
Carolyn Eaton, previously known as "Valentine Sally", was found on 14 February 1982, and was identified on 22 February 2021.
Evelyn Colon, United States, found murdered in 1976 and known as "Beth Doe" until her identification in 2021.
John Gregory, found in 1859 and identified in 2021, the engineer (warrant officer) of HMS Erebus, a ship that attempted to traverse the then-undocumented Canadian Arctic and find the Northwest Passage. His identification is currently the oldest being made by DNA comparison.
Stevie Crawford, A boy found dead in a river in Ashland, Oregon on 11 July 1963, and formerly known as "Boy in a Bundle", was identified on 28 June 2021, thanks to advances in DNA.
Gordon Sanderson, Canada, found in 1977 and was known as "Septic Tank Sam" until his identification in 2021.
Margaret Fetterolf, previously known as "Woodlawn Jane Doe", was found murdered on 12 September 1976, in Woodlawn, Maryland, and identified on 15 September 2021.
Sherri Jarvis, previously known as "Walker County Jane Doe", was found murdered on 1 November 1980, in Huntsville, Texas, and publicly identified on 9 November 2021.
Amy Yeary, previously known as "Fond du Lac County Jane Doe", was found on 23 November 2008, in Fond du Lac County, Wisconsin, and identified on 23 November 2021.
Tammy Terrell, previously known as "Arroyo Grande Jane Doe", was found murdered on 5 October 1980, in Henderson, Nevada, and identified on 2 December 2021.
Sharon Lee Gallegos, previously known as "Little Miss Nobody", was a murdered toddler found on 31 July 1960, in Congress, Arizona, and identified on 15 March 2022.
Kelly, previously known as "El Dorado Jane Doe", was found on 10 July 1991, in El Dorado, Arkansas, and identified on 24 May 2022.
Carl Isaacs Jr., previously known as "Rock County John Doe" and "John Clinton Doe", was found on 26 November 1995, in Rock County, Wisconsin, and identified on 14 June 2022.
Dawn Olanick, previously known as "Princess Doe", was found on 15 July 1982, and was publicly identified on 15 July 2022.
Ruth Marie Terry, previously known as "Lady of the Dunes", was found on 26 July 1974, and was publicly identified on 31 October 2022.
Joseph Augustus Zarelli, previously known as "Boy in the Box", was found on 25 February 1957, identified by law enforcement on 30 November 2022, and publicly identified on 8 December 2022.
Amore Joveah Wiggins, previously known as Opelika Jane Doe, was discovered on January 28, 2012, and identified in January 2023.

See also 
List of wheel-well stowaway flights, many of whom do not survive the attempt and have not been identified
Body identification

References

External links 

The Doe Network
National Center for Missing and Exploited Children
National Missing and Unidentified Persons System
FBI Unidentified Victims
"Help ID Me" on Facebook

Forensic science